"We're Over" is a song written by Barry Mann and Cynthia Weil, and recorded by American country music artist Johnny Rodriguez.  It was released in September 1974 as the first single from his album Songs About Ladies and Love.  The song peaked at number 3 on the Billboard Hot Country Singles chart. It also reached number 1 on the RPM Country Tracks chart in Canada.

Cover versions 
 1975: Glen Campbell covered the song on his 1975 Rhinestone Cowboy album.
 1980: Demis Roussos on his album Man of the World

Chart performance

References

1974 singles
Johnny Rodriguez songs
Glen Campbell songs
Mercury Records singles
1974 songs
Songs written by Barry Mann
Songs with lyrics by Cynthia Weil